Herman Riddle Page (May 23, 1866 – April 21, 1942) was an American bishop in the Episcopal Church in the United States of America. He was the second bishop of the Missionary District of Spokane, fourth bishop of the Idaho, fifth bishop of the Michigan, and fourth bishop of the Northern Michigan. His son, Herman R. Page, Jr., succeeded him as bishop of the Episcopal Diocese of Northern Michigan.

Biography
Page was born in Boston, Massachusetts, on May 23, 1866, to Eben Blake Page and Harriet Josephine (née Woodward). He attended the Boston Latin School and Harvard University (A.B. 1888). In 1891 he graduated from the Episcopal Theological School in Cambridge and was ordained that year. He held several positions including Holy Trinity Mission, Wallace, Idaho (a mining camp); St. Luke's Church in Coeur d'Alene, Idaho; St. John's Church in Fall Rivers, Massachusetts and Christ Church, Swanee. In 1900 he moved to St. Paul's Church in Chicago, Illinois, and in 1915 became the bishop of the Missionary District of Spokane, Washington.

He was married to Mary Riddle Page, had a brother, John E. Page of Boston, and a son, the Reverend Herman R. Page.

References 

1866 births
1942 deaths
Episcopal bishops of Washington (state)
Episcopal bishops of Idaho
Clergy from Boston
Harvard University alumni
Boston Latin School alumni
Episcopal bishops of Michigan
Episcopal bishops of Northern Michigan
Episcopal bishops of Spokane